The 2016–17 UMBC Retrievers men's basketball team  represented the University of Maryland, Baltimore County during the 2016–17 NCAA Division I men's basketball season. The Retrievers, led by first-year head coach Ryan Odom, played their home games at the Retriever Activities Center in Catonsville, Maryland as members of the America East Conference. They finished the season 21–13, 9–7 in America East play to finish in fifth place. They lost in the quarterfinals of the America East tournament to New Hampshire. They were invited to the CollegeInsider.com Tournament where they defeated Fairfield, Saint Francis (PA), and Liberty before losing in the semifinals to Texas A&M–Corpus Christi.

Previous season
The Retrievers finished the 2015–16 season 7–25, 3–13 in America East play to finish in last place. They lost in the first round of the America East tournament to Stony Brook.

On March 3, 2016, head coach Aki Thomas was fired. He finished at UMBC with a four-year record of 28–95. On March 30, the school hired Ryan Odom as head coach.

Preseason 
UMBC was picked to finish sixth in the preseason America East poll. Jahad Thomas, Jr. was selected to the preseason All-America East team.

Departures

2016 incoming recruits

Roster

Schedule and results

|-
!colspan=9 style=| Non-conference regular season

|-
!colspan=9 style=| America East regular season

|-
!colspan=9 style=| America East tournament

|-
!colspan=9 style=| CIT

References

UMBC
UMBC
UMBC Retrievers men's basketball seasons
2016 in sports in Maryland
2017 in sports in Maryland